Robert DiToma (born September 25, 1983) is an American baseball coach and former second baseman, who is the current head baseball coach of the San Francisco Dons. DiToma played college baseball at Mercy College in New York from 2002 to 2005 for coach Bill Sullivan. He served as the head coach of the Fairleigh Dickinson Knights (2020–2022).

Playing career
As a freshman at Mercy College in 2002, DiToma had a 12 doubles and 30 walks, both which ranked in the top 10 for Mercy records.

In the 2004 season as a junior, DiToma had 58 hits, while hitting 12 doubles. He was named a 2nd team All-New York Collegiate Athletic Conference performer in 2004.

Coaching career
DiToma began his coaching career as an assistant at Manhattanville College. DiToma later coached for Temple University. After a single season at Temple, DiToma was named the hitting coach for the Siena College. Following the 2009 season, DiToma joined the staff of the Iona Gaels baseball program. On July 23, 2013, DiToma was named an assistant at Fordham University.

On June 20, 2019, DiToma was named the head coach of the Fairleigh Dickinson Knights baseball program.

On June 15, 2022, DiToma left the Knights to become the head baseball coach of the San Francisco Dons.

See also
 List of current NCAA Division I baseball coaches

References

External links
Fairleigh Dickinson Knights profile

Living people
1983 births
Mercy Mavericks baseball players
Manhattanville Valiants baseball coaches
Temple Owls baseball coaches
San Francisco Dons baseball coaches
Siena Saints baseball coaches
Iona Gaels baseball coaches
Fordham Rams baseball coaches
Fairleigh Dickinson Knights baseball coaches
Mercy College (New York) alumni